WNJC (1360 AM) is a radio station broadcasting brokered programming. Licensed to Washington Township, New Jersey, it serves the southeastern portions of the Philadelphia radio market  (due to WPAZ, which covers the northwestern portions of the metro at 1370), and is currently owned by Forsythe Broadcasting, LLC.

History
The station originally bore the call letters WWBZ and was licensed to Vineland, New Jersey. WWBZ operated from 1946 to 1989, then went silent. On September 1, 1990, it moved to, and petitioned to change its city of license to Washington Township and returned to the air as WVSJ ("Voice of South Jersey"), carrying mostly talk programming. WVSJ was one of the first Philadelphia-area stations to carry Rush Limbaugh on weekdays, but lost rights to the program when it was picked up by WWDB. In 1992, the station adopted a country music format and became WNJC ("New Jersey Country"), shifted to Spanish-language programming by 1994, then evolved into its current brokered format.

In 1994, the station was purchased by radio engineer Michael Venditti and his partner John Forsythe to create Forsythe Broadcasting, Inc. Michael Venditti died of cancer in April 1998 and his wife Joan took over as partner. The studio was located on 1893 Hurffville Rd. in Deptford from 1994 till 2005. In November 2005, the station moved to 123 Egg Harbor Rd in Washington Township, where it remained until May 2017.

In June 2017, the station was rescued from going dark by Antonio Muniz and Javier Machorro. The new studio is located at 401 Cooper Landing Road in Cherry Hill. The station is now being marketed as a multicultural station. Spanish-language format is heard daily from 6:00am to 4:00pm, followed by English-language "Today's Hits & Yesterday's favorites" along with brokered programming.

References

External links
Official website

Radio stations established in 1946
NJC